Mohammadabad-e Herati (also Romanized as Moḩammadābād-e Herātī and Moḩammadābād-e Harātī; also known as Moḩammadābād and Muhammadābād) is a village in Ferdows Rural District, Ferdows District, Rafsanjan County, Kerman Province, Iran. At the 2006 census, its population was 282, in 70 families.

References 

Populated places in Rafsanjan County